Eildon Hill lies just south of Melrose, Scotland in the Scottish Borders, overlooking the town. The name is usually pluralised into "the Eildons" or "Eildon Hills", because of its triple peak. A Roman army signalling station was later constructed on the same site as this hill fort.

The mid hilltop is the highest, whilst the south hilltop is the lowest. The hills are owned by the Duke of Buccleuch, Scotland's largest private landowner. As with all land in Scotland the public have a right of responsible access to the hills, and there are many paths crossing the area and leading to all three summits.

The hills form part of the Eildon and Leaderfoot National Scenic Area, one of forty such areas in Scotland, which have been defined so as to identify areas of exceptional scenery and to ensure its protection from inappropriate development. The areas protected by the national scenic area (NSA) designation are considered to represent the type of scenic beauty "popularly associated with Scotland and for which it is renowned". The Eildon and Leaderfoot NSA covers 3877 ha, and extends to include the town of Melrose, Scott's View and Leaderfoot Viaduct.

History

Excavations have revealed evidence that the hill fort was occupied by 1000 BC, in the Bronze Age. The ramparts seem to have been built and rebuilt in three phases. 296 individual hut floors have been identified within the fort, suggesting a population of around 2000, and making it one of the largest known in Scotland from this period. The hill fort is thought to have been the capital of the Selgovae, who lived in upper Tweeddale prior to the arrival of the Romans.

In the 1st century AD the Roman army built the massive fort of Trimontium at Newstead, named after the three peaks, at the foot of the hill on the bank of the River Tweed. In association with this fort they constructed a signal tower with a tiled roof in a 15 m diameter enclosure built on the summit of Eildon North Hill. The hill fort may have been abandoned by this time, as Roman archaeological finds uncovered during excavation of the site in 1986 all overlaid native finds. The tower was thought to have been constructed out of timber during the Flavian period, with a later tower being constructed out of stone during the reign of Emperor Antoninus Pius. Finds including Roman coins and pottery have suggested that some of the house platforms were again in use in the 2nd to 4th century.

There is some evidence that prehistoric peoples regarded the Eildon Hills as a holy place and scholars believe they may have been a place of ceremonial gatherings. There are several holy springs around the base of the hills, now dedicated to Christian saints, but probably originally sacred to Celtic deities.

The final part of the word is Old English dun, meaning a rounded hill, while the first part has been variously etymologized as Brittonic eil (referring to a fenced enclosure) or Old English  ǣled ("fire") or ǣlǣte ("empty place").<ref>{{cite web|last=James|first=Alan|title=The Brittonic Language in the Old North: A Guide to the Place-Name Evidence, Volume 2 (Guide to the Elements)|year=2019|url=https://spns.org.uk/wp-content/uploads/2019/03/Alan_James_Brittonic_Language_in_the_Old_North_BLITON_Volume_II_Dictionary_2019_Edition.pdf|format=PDF|website=Spns.org.uk}}</ref>

Formation
It is possible that the hills were formed deep beneath the Earth's surface as ancient laccoliths.

In folklore
Eildon is said to be a "hollow hill", and is mentioned in the legend of Thomas the Rhymer. Some believe Thomas went under the hill itself, and certainly part of the ballad occurs in the vicinity. Sir Walter Scott tells the tale of a horse dealer who is paid in "ancient coin" by an elderly buyer in old-fashioned dress and taken inside the hill at night. A host of armed knights lie asleep at their horses' feet; their sleeping leader is King Arthur. Shown a horn and a sword, in confusion the dealer blows the horn: the men begin to awake and a loud voice indicates that he has been proved a coward for not seizing the sword first. A whirlwind ejects him from the chamber and outside he tells his story to some shepherds before dropping dead of exhaustion. Scott identifies the elderly man as Thomas the Rhymer. Another legend concerns the Eildon Tree Stone, a large moss-covered boulder near Melrose, marking the spot where the Fairy Queen led Thomas into her realms in the heart of the hills.

The volcanic rock was said to have been cleft in three by the wizard Michael Scot, as relayed by Walter Scott in his 1805 poem, The Lay of the Last Minstrel:

In these far climes it was my lotTo meet the wondrous Michael Scott,A wizard, of such dreaded fame,
Than when, in Salmanca's cave,Him listed his magic wand to wave,The bells would ring in Notre Dame!Some of his skill he taught to me;And Warrior, I could say to theeThe words that cleft Eildon hills in three,And bridled the Tweed with a curb of stone:But to speak them were a deadly sin.

James Hogg retold the legend in his 1823 novel The Three Perils of Man.

Media
This place was cited in the lyric of the song "Eiledon", from Big Country's The Seer album.

See also
List of places in the Scottish Borders
List of places in Scotland

Notes

References
 Scotland Before History - Stuart Piggott, Edinburgh University Press 1982,  
 Scotland's Hidden History'' - Ian Armit, Tempus (in association with Historic Scotland) 1998, 
 AQA A2 Geography - Amanda Barker, David Redfern, Malcom Skinner, Phillip Allan Updates 2008

Archaeological sites in the Scottish Borders
Marilyns of Scotland
Locations associated with Arthurian legend
Hill forts in Scotland
Mountains and hills of the Scottish Borders
Bronze Age Scotland
Former populated places in Scotland
Bronze Age sites in Scotland
Scheduled monuments in Scotland